Toxicofera (Greek for "those who bear toxins") is a proposed clade of scaled reptiles (squamates) that includes the Serpentes (snakes), Anguimorpha (monitor lizards, gila monster, and alligator lizards) and Iguania (iguanas, agamas, and chameleons). Toxicofera contains about 4,600 species, (nearly 60%) of extant Squamata. It encompasses all venomous reptile species, as well as numerous related non-venomous species. There is little morphological evidence to support this grouping, however it has been recovered by all molecular analyses as of 2012.

The oldest known toxicoferan is Cryptovaranoides, an anguimorph from the Late Triassic of England.

Cladistics 
Toxicofera combines the following groups from traditional classification:

 Suborder Serpentes (snakes)
 Suborder Iguania (iguanas, agamid lizards, chameleons, etc.)
 Infraorder Anguimorpha, consisting of:
 Family Varanidae (monitor lizards)
 Family Anguidae (alligator lizards, glass lizards, etc.)
 Family Helodermatidae (Gila monster and Mexican beaded lizard)
 Family Shinisauridae (Chinese crocodile lizard)
 Family Xenosauridae (knob-scaled lizards)

The relationship between these extant groups and a couple of extinct taxa are shown in the following cladogram, which is based on Reeder et al. (2015; Fig. 1).

Venom 

Venom in squamates has historically been considered a rarity; while it has been known in Serpentes since ancient times, the actual percentage of snake species considered venomous was relatively small (around 25%). Of the approximately 2,650 species of advanced snakes (Caenophidia), only the front-fanged species (~650) were considered venomous by the anthropocentric definition.
Following the classification of Helodermatidae in the 19th century, their venom was thought to have developed independently. In snakes, the venom gland is in the upper jaw, but in helodermatids, it is found in the lower jaw. The origin of venom in squamates was thus considered relatively recent in evolutionary terms and the result of convergent evolution among the seemingly-polyphyletic venomous snake families.

In 2003 a study was published that described venom in snake subfamilies previously thought to lack it. Further study claimed nearly all "non-venomous" snakes produce venom to a certain extent, suggesting a single, and thus far more ancient origin for venom in Serpentes than had been considered until then. As a practical matter, Fry cautioned:

Some non-venomous snakes have been previously thought to have only mild 'toxic saliva'. But these results suggest that they actually possess true venoms. We even isolated from a rat snake [Coelognathus radiatus (formerly known as Elaphe radiata)], a snake common in pet stores, a typical cobra-style neurotoxin, one that is as potent as comparative toxins found in close relatives of the cobra. These snakes typically have smaller quantities of venom and lack fangs, but they can still deliver their venom via their numerous sharp teeth. But not all of these snakes are dangerous. It does mean, however, that we need to re-evaluate the relative danger of non-venomous snakes.

This prompted further research, which led to the discovery of venom (and venom genes) in species from groups which were not previously known to produce it, e.g. in Iguania (specifically Pogona barbata from the family Agamidae) and Varanidae (from Varanus varius). It is thought that this was the result of descent from a common venom-producing squamate ancestor; the hypothesis was described simply as the "venom clade" when first proposed to the scientific community. The venom clade included Anguidae for phylogenetic reasons and adopted a previously suggested clade name: Toxicofera.

It was estimated that the common ancestral species that first developed venom in the venom clade lived on the order of 200 million years ago. The venoms are thought to have evolved after genes normally active in various parts of the body duplicated and the copies found new use in the salivary glands.

Among snake families traditionally classified as venomous, the capacity seems to have evolved to extremes more than once by parallel evolution; 'non-venomous' snake lineages have either lost the ability to produce venom (but may still have lingering venom pseudogenes) or actually do produce venom in small quantities (e.g. 'toxic saliva'), likely sufficient to assist in small prey capture, but not normally causing harm to humans if bitten.

The newly discovered diversity of squamate species producing venoms is a treasure trove for those seeking to develop new pharmaceutical drugs; many of these venoms lower blood pressure, for example. Previously known venomous squamates have already provided the basis for medications such as Ancrod, Captopril, Eptifibatide, Exenatide and Tirofiban.

The world's largest venomous lizard and the largest species of venomous land animal is the Komodo dragon.

Criticism 
Other scientists such as Washington State University biologist Kenneth V. Kardong and toxicologists Scott A. Weinstein and Tamara L. Smith, have stated that the allegation of venom glands found in many of these animals "has had the effect of underestimating the variety of complex roles played by oral secretions in the biology of reptiles, produced a very narrow view of oral secretions and resulted in misinterpretation of reptilian evolution". According to these scientists "reptilian oral secretions contribute to many biological roles other than to quickly dispatch prey". These researchers concluded that, "Calling all in this clade venomous implies an overall potential danger that does not exist, misleads in the assessment of medical risks, and confuses the biological assessment of squamate biochemical systems". More recently, it has been suggested that many of the shared toxins that underlie the Toxicofera hypothesis are in fact not toxins at all.

References

External links 

 Lizards' poisonous secret is revealed November 16, 2005
 The Surprising Origin of Venom Revealed November 17, 2005
 Which Came First, the Snake or the Venom? November 21, 2005
 Genealogy of scaly reptiles rewritten by new research November 22, 2005
 Venomdoc Homepage, Downloads
 The Venom Cure: The Power of Poison
 Nature Podcast November 17, 2005 (segment on the venom clade begins approximately 22 minutes into the program)

Squamata
Toxicology
Phylogenetics
Evolutionary biology
Venomous reptiles